Shamima Nazneen is a Bangladeshi film, stage, television actress and director. She was born at Gangkulpara Village, Achmita Union, Katiadi Upazilla in Kishoreganj District
 She won Meril Prothom Alo Award for Best Actress for her role in the film Ghetuputra Komola (2012).

Education and career
Nazneen earned her master's degree in Physics from Eden College in 1994. She got involved in acting through the theater troupe Nagarik Natya Sampradaya in 1996.

Works
Acting

Films
 Srabon Megher Din (1999)
 Dui Duari (2001)
 Shyamol Chhaya (2005)
 Ghetuputra Komola (2012)
 Pita - The Father (2012)
 Chorabali (2012)
 Mon Bojhena

Serial Dramas
 Kala Koitor
 Ekla Pakhi

Dramas
 Somudro Bilash Private Limited
 Nitu Tomay Bhalobashi
 Bonur Golpo

Direction
 Package Sangbad
 ''Somudro Bilash Private Limited (assistant direction)

References

External links

Living people
Eden Mohila College alumni
Bangladeshi film actresses
Bangladeshi stage actresses
Bangladeshi television actresses
Best Supporting Actress Bachsas Award winners
Place of birth missing (living people)
Date of birth missing (living people)
Year of birth missing (living people)